The 2001–02 CBA season is the seventh CBA season.

The season ran from December 8, 2001 to April 19, 2002. Shaanxi Kylins and Shenzhen Leopards were promoted from the Second Division.  Taiwanese club Sina Lions joined CBA in this season.

Regular Season Standings

Playoffs 

The top 8 teams in the regular season advanced to the playoffs. For the first time, the quarterfinals used best-of-five series to determine the advancing team.

In the Final series, Shanghai Sharks defeated Bayi Rockets (3-1), snapped a series of 6 consecutive championships for the Bayi.

Teams in bold advanced to the next round. The numbers to the left of each team indicate the team's seeding in regular season, and the numbers to the right indicate the number of games the team won in that round. Home court advantage belongs to the team with the better regular season record; teams enjoying the home advantage are shown in italics.

Relegations
The bottom 4 teams played the relegation round by round-robin.

Beijing Olympians and Shenzhen Leopards were relegated to the Second Division.

References

See also
Chinese Basketball Association

 
Chinese Basketball Association seasons
League
CBA